Archive Fever: A Freudian Impression is a book by the French philosopher Jacques Derrida. It was first published in 1995 by Éditions Galilée. An English translation by Eric Prenowitz was published in 1996.

Summary

In Archive Fever, Derrida discusses the nature and function of the archive, particularly in Freudian terms and in light of the death drive. The book also contains discussions of Judaism and Jewish identity and of electronic technology such as e-mail.

References

External links
 Excerpts
 

1995 non-fiction books
Archival science
French non-fiction books
Museum books
Philosophy books
Works by Jacques Derrida